Summoner 2 is an action role-playing game developed by Volition and published by THQ as the sequel to Summoner. It was originally released for PlayStation 2 in 2002 and was re-released for the GameCube in 2003 with some visual changes as Summoner: A Goddess Reborn. The game features improved visuals and a more real-time, action-oriented combat system from the original.

Instead of Joseph, the player now takes on the role of Maia, Queen of Halassar, who is the goddess Laharah reborn, and can transform herself into a variety of "summonable" creatures. Maia must heal the legendary Tree of Eleh, the source of Aosi, the language of creation. Along the way, she meets a host of characters, including Yago from the original Summoner game.

Gameplay
Similar to its predecessor, combat is in real time, with spells cast over time depending on the complexity of the spell. The chain attack system from the first game was removed in favor of a more traditional button combo and guard system. Skills are increased as the characters level up, and equipment is collected, including skills that are specific for AI controlled characters, meaning the player can focus playing a specific character if desired. Some enemies will respawn over time.

Unlike the first game, which was played with an unchangeable 5 member party (except for the summon), Summoner 2 only allows up to 3 characters to be in the party at once, although these characters are picked from a group of 7. Some sections of the game have a fixed character set-up, and most sections require Maia to be in the party. Also unlike the first game, overworld travel is done point to point, with no random encounters during travel.
In addition to forwarding the main plot, Maia can also directly influence the development of the kingdom. She can donate gold collected from her adventures to improve the health services, education, and military of her realm, and also issue judgements on a variety of political issues. The decisions made will have repercussions later in the game.

Story
The game takes place 20 years after the previous installment. Halassar, a province in the Empire of Galdyr, distant from the kingdoms of Medeva and Orenia, was foretold as the birthplace of the Goddess Laharah Reborn. The priestesses of Laharah declared Maia as the goddess when she was an infant and armies rose up in Maia's name, led by the Emperor's brother Prince Taurgis, making Halassar independent from Galdyr and Maia, the Queen of the Halassar Empire. Traveling with her is Sangaril, an orphan trained by the Shadow Clan assassins of the Munari, who was sent to kill Maia as a child, but instead became her sworn bodyguard. While reclaiming the Book of Prophets from the Halassar Palace traitor Dama Sivora, Maia activates a rune stone embedded in the pirate island stronghold of Prince Neru, on the Isle of Teomura, gaining the ability to transform into one of the 4 Summons. After recovering the Book of the Prophets and returning to the Palace she learns more about her destiny.

The Prophecy states that the Tree of Eleh, which gave life to the world, was shattered by the Tempest, an evil storm. Maia, the Goddess Laharah Reborn, is tasked with restoring the Tree as prophecy dictates. Maia next responds to a surprise attack by the remnants of the King of Adamur, the kingdom which was greatly truncated when she was identified as the Goddess Laharah. Attacking the Imperial Sepulchre the Empire has seized, Maia encounters Krobelus, under control of the Tempest, and defeats him. Curious to Krobelus' knowledge of her Prophecy, she begins to track him to the Prison of Indubal, where he has been held prisoner after being seized by Imperial forces of King Azraman, King of Galdyr. Krobelus explains that he was possessed, and that they must travel to the ice caverns of Eleh to find the gateway to the Realm of Twilight so that he can free himself of the evil and where Maia hopes to discover the key to restoring the Tree of Eleh. They hope to use a flying vessel which belongs to the legendary Morbazan who lives in Munari City, home to an aquatic race that worship many gods. There they encounter Morbazan, who tells the Goddess he will lend them his vessel in exchange for Iari. Not knowing what that is, Maia delves into the Adytum of the Unseen, and finds Iari who turns out to be a sentient weapon machine. She returns to Morbazan, who agrees to lead them up north to the Eleh Caverns, where the group find the monk Yago of Iona, from the first Summoner game, who guides them to a fragment of the Tree of Eleh, which acts as a portal to the multiplanar Realm of Twilight. Maia finds herself in a place called the Wheel of the Perduellion, controlled by a race who define themselves by a complicated system of Masks and are intent on slaying all of their gods. The Perduellion inform Maia that her friends are trapped and can only be freed if she destroys their god, which entails complex quests in the Temple of the Archons, the Bibliopolis of Lost Tomes, the Tribunal, Vandal's Ruins to battle Vandal and his daughter, Nepenthes, and Paludal's Bridge with mud golems. She frees Morbazan from a trial by combat, discovering who he really is; that he and Iari are the last of the Unseen, the former gods and leaders of the Perduellion. Once Maia has freed all of her party, they must fight the Perduellion's new tyrant ruler Ushandul and travel to the stronghold of Sharangir to control his tower and therefore defeat the powerful Khargathalan. After this the party are automatically transported back to the Palace of Halassar except for Maia, who is sent alone to the Dream of Eleh to speak with the spirits of Rosalind, the Abbess of Iona and Yago's daughter, and the God Urath who was made whole again in the first Summoner game. She learns from them more about the path she wishes to go down in order to save the kingdom and defeat the Tempest. Maia's trusted friend and guide Surdama Kir betrays her and becomes a slave to the Tempest. In the Palace Throne Room, Maia and her friends travel to the Labyrinth of the Guardians, where they are attacked in four portals. After completion of the Labyrinth, Maia is able to access the 13th Summon and its powers. Showdowns at the Eye of the Storm and the Celestial Sphere follow, with the weakened Maia joining with Iari in a final desperate move, to become more powerful and defeat the Tempest once and for all. The game ends with Maia/Iari defeating the Tempest and becoming the Tree of Eleh itself.

Reception

The original Summoner 2 received "generally favorable reviews", while A Goddess Reborn received "average" reviews, according to the review aggregation website Metacritic. GameSpot named Summoner 2 the best PlayStation 2 game of February 2003.

References

External links
 Official website via Internet Archive
 

2002 video games
Action role-playing video games
Fantasy video games
GameCube games
PlayStation 2 games
THQ games
Video game sequels
Video games featuring female protagonists
Single-player video games
Video games developed in the United States